Everything Is Wrong is the third studio album by American electronica musician Moby, released on March 14, 1995 by record labels Mute in the United Kingdom and Elektra in the United States. It was released with a limited-edition bonus disc of ambient music titled Underwater.

Background 
Following the release of two albums, Moby and Ambient, on Instinct, Moby signed to Mute and Elektra and began work on what he felt was his first "legitimate" album, seeking to create a record that encompassed his various musical influences. Moby has described Everything Is Wrong as "a record that almost served as a lifeboat for the songs I cared the most about", noting that he attempted to cover as many musical styles as possible not "out of trying to be eclectic, but just because I was in love with all of these genres and I felt like this may be my only chance to make a record."

Moby recorded and mixed the album himself in his apartment on Mott Street in Manhattan, New York, using inexpensive recording equipment. Everything Is Wrong features guest vocal contributions from Rozz Morehead, whom Moby had met while performing on the British television program Top of the Pops, and Mimi Goese, whose work with the band Hugo Largo he admired, and who he later found out lived just a block away from him.

Content 
Moby titled the album Everything Is Wrong and wrote its extensive accompanying liner notes as a means of expressing some ideas that he felt were important to him, later reflecting, "At the time, I was — and am still — a vegan and an animal rights activist, really militant in all my beliefs. So I would wake up really angry every day, and sleep angry every night because I thought the world was in terrible shape, and I thought, 'What small thing can I do to express my beliefs that the world is in such terrible shape?' And that’s where the title of the album came from." Inside the album's booklet, Moby provides two personal essays, quotes from notable figures (from Albert Einstein to St. Francis of Assisi), and facts that he has collected regarding subjects such as vegetarianism, environmentalism, and animal experiments.

Critical reception 

Everything Is Wrong was released to critical acclaim from music critics. Spins Barry Walters praised its diverse range of musical styles compared to most other "one-dimensional" electronic albums and dubbed it "a hugely passionate album held together by its intensity". Greg Kot of the Chicago Tribune felt that Moby "explodes the boundaries of the genre" with an album "as moving as it is adventurous", while Lorraine Ali of the Los Angeles Times wrote that Everything Is Wrong "swoops from agony to ecstasy, leaping from the glittery heights of disco divadom to the rampaging ugliness of speed-metal to the refined feel of classical—while always remaining consistently Moby." In The Village Voice, Robert Christgau remarked: "Where in concert he subsumes rockist guitar and classical pretensions in grand, joyous rhythmic release, on album his distant dreams remain tangents." Everything Is Wrong was voted the third best album of 1995 in The Village Voices year-end Pazz & Jop critics' poll. By 2002, the album had sold over 180,000 copies in the United States.

In popular culture 

"God Moving Over the Face of the Waters" is featured in the closing moments of the 1995 film Heat.

"First Cool Hive" is featured in the final scene of the 1996 film Scream.

"When It's Cold I'd Like to Die" is featured in The Sopranos, at the end of the episode "Join the Club". Additionally, the song was featured in season 1 and 4 of Stranger Things.
An instrumental version features at the end of the 2006 documentary film Deliver Us From Evil.

Track listing

Personnel 
Credits for Everything Is Wrong adapted from album liner notes.

 Moby – engineering, production, programming, writing
 Kochie Banton – vocals on "Feeling So Real" and "Everytime You Touch Me"
 Mimi Goese – lyrics and vocals on "Into the Blue" and "When It's Cold I'd Like to Die"
 Rozz Morehead – vocals on "Feeling So Real" and "Everytime You Touch Me"
 Myim Rose – vocals on "Feeling So Real"
 Saundra Williams – vocals on "Bring Back My Happiness"
 Nicole Zaray – vocals on "Feeling So Real"

Artwork and design
 Barbie – art direction
 Jill Greenberg – photography
 Slim Smith – layout

Charts

Certifications

Remix album 

A two-disc remix album entitled Everything Is Wrong: Non-Stop DJ Mix by Evil Ninja Moby or Everything Is Wrong: Mixed! Remixed! was released in January 1996 by Mute. The album was mixed by Moby from various remixes that were commissioned by the label.

Track listing

Charts

Certifications

References

External links 
 
 

Moby albums
1995 albums
Mute Records albums
Techno albums by American artists
Ambient albums by American artists
Elektra Records albums
Albums produced by Moby